Shi En is a fictional character in Water Margin, one of the Four Great Classical Novels in Chinese literature. Nicknamed "Golden Eyed Tiger Cub", he ranks 85th among the 108 Stars of Destiny and 49th among the 72 Earthly Fiends.

Background
The novel depicts Shi En as six chi tall, handsome, fair-skinned and sporting a goatee and a moustache. His father is the superintendent of a prison camp in Mengzhou.

Meeting Wu Song
Wu Song reaches Mengzhou to which he is exiled after killing his sister-in-law and her adulterer lover Ximen Qing to avenge their murder of his brother Wu Dalang. Wu is told that the prison authorities would flog newly arrived exiles 100 times with staff to strike fear in them. But the flogging could be waived with bribes to all levels of the prison including the superintendent. When brought before the superintendent because he refuses to pay up, Wu swears he would never stoop to intimidation. Shi En, who is the superintendent's son and is standing next to his father at that time, whispers to the latter telling him to let Wu off with the excuse that he is ill. Wu is thus spared the beating.

Shi En arranges for Wu Song to be put in a clean cell and served with good food and drinks. Wu suspects all this is a run-up to murdering him in prison. But as the good treatment continues for days he forces a jailer to tell the reason. Shi En is thus forced to come to meet Wu. He says he has accorded Wu good treatments because he has heard of his heroism and superhuman strength. But Shi En in fact has a favour to ask from Wu. He used to run a restaurant at a thriving place called "Happy Forest", which actually is his station for collecting protection fees from the local businesses and tolls from passing travellers. One day Jiang Zhong, a thug nicknamed "Jiang the Door God", came, beat Shi up and took over the restaurant and hence the control of Happy Forest. Shi En hopes Wu Song could help him seize back the place and his lucrative racket.

Wu Song agrees and asks to be treated to three bowls of wine at each inn he passes on his way to Happy Forest. By the time he gets there, he is very drunk. At the disputed restaurant he provokes Jiang Zhong into a fight and beats the latter easily. He orders the thug to apologise to Shi En and leave Mengzhou for good.

Humiliated, Jiang Zhong seeks help from his relative Instructor Zhang, who is connected to one Inspector Zhang Mengfang. Inspector Zhang pretends to be an admirer of Wu Song for his heroism and invites him to stay in his house. He then frames Wu for theft and sends him to prison intending to murder him inside there. Shi En bribes the prison warden and thwarts the murder plan. Meanwhile, Jiang has beaten up Shi and re-takes Happy Forest.

Becoming an outlaw
Wu Song is exiled once again to another prison camp. Jiang Zhong bribes his two escorts to kill him on the way with the help of two of his students. Shi En warns Wu Song of the danger when sending him off. Coming to a bridge over a river, Wu sets upon the four men, overpowering and killing all of them. He returns to the house of Inspector Zhang, where massacres the official's family. He also slays Zhang himself, Jiang Zhong and Instructor Zhang, who are joyously drinking in the belief that he is dead. Wu runs into the couple Zhang Qing and Sun Erniang again, who suggest that he dress himself up as an itinerant priest with his hair let down so as to hide his identity.  Thus Wu Song travels safely to join the outlaw stronghold at Mount Twin Dragons under Lu Zhishen. As Shi En is implicated in Wu's case, he also flees Mengzhou. He subsequently joins Mount Twin Dragons.

After being beaten in his military attack on Liangshan Marsh, the imperial general Huyan Zhuo flees to Qingzhou (in present-day Shandong), where he volunteers to wipe out all the local bandits to redeem himself. Concluding that Huyan is a tough opponent, Mount Twin Dragons and two other strongholds in Qingzhou request help from Liangshan. Song Jiang comes to Qingzhou with a force and captures and wins over Huyan. The bandits of Mount Twin Dragons, including Shi En, are absorbed into Liangshan.

Campaigns and death
Shi En is appointed as one of the leaders of the Liangshan infantry after the 108 Stars of Destiny came together in what is called the Grand Assembly. He participates in the campaigns against the Liao invaders and rebel forces in Song territory following amnesty from Emperor Huizong for Liangshan.

In the assault on Kunshan by waterway in the campaign against Fang La, Shi En, led by the Ruan brothers, drowns after falling into the river as he could not swim.

References
 
 
 
 
 
 
 

72 Earthly Fiends
Fictional prison officers and governors
Fictional characters from Henan